In contract law, an integration clause, merger clause,  (sometimes, particularly in the United Kingdom, referred to as an entire agreement clause)  is a clause in a written contract which declares that contract to be the complete and final agreement between the parties. It is often placed at or towards the end of the contract. Any pre-contractual material which the parties wish to be incorporated into the contract need to be assembled with it or explicitly referred to in the contractual documentation.

Effect 
A contract that has such a clause may be deemed an integrated contract, and any previous negotiations in which the parties to the contract had considered different terms will be deemed superseded by the final writing. However, many modern cases have found merger clauses to be only a rebuttable presumption.

In the United States, the existence of such a term is normally not conclusive proof that no varied or additional conditions exist with respect to the performance of the contract beyond those that are in the writing but instead is simply evidence of that fact.

In Personnel Hygiene Services Ltd v Mitchell, an England and Wales Court of Appeal case where there were two distinct contractual relationships between the parties, a service agreement superseded by a compromise agreement, and a separate share purchase agreement, it was held that the entire agreement provisions in the compromise agreement annulled the service agreement but the share purchase agreement remained intact.

Sample clause
The following language is an example of an integration clause:

Collateral contracts
Parties in dispute may wish to argue that a previous understanding or implied agreement, made before a contract with an entire agreement was signed, should also be separately enforced as a collateral contract. Christopher Nugee QC, now a Lord Justice of Appeal, has ruled that the existence of an entire agreement clause within the main contract creates an "obvious difficulty" for a party who wishes to rely on such a separate agreement.

See also
 Parol evidence rule

References

Contract law
Contract clauses